Paula Martí Zambrano (born 29 January 1980) is a professional golfer from Spain. She used to be a member of the LPGA Tour and now plays the Ladies European Tour.

Amateur career 

Martí was born in Barcelona, Catalonia, Spain. As an amateur, she was National Spanish Champion in 1996 and a member of the European Junior Ryder Cup teams of 1995 and 1997. She moved to the United States in 1998, and graduated from Saddlebrook Prep School and the Arnold Palmer Golf Academy. She was 1998 AJGA All-American.

Martí attended the University of Florida in Gainesville, Florida, United States, where she played for the Florida Gators women's golf team in 2000 and was recognized as a second-team All-Southeastern Conference (SEC) selection. She turned professional in 2000, starting her professional career on the Ladies European Tour in 2001.

Professional career 

She had two victories in her rookie season, winning the Ladies Italian Open and Ladies British Masters.

In 2002 Marti won the EDUCOM ALPG Players' Championship, came second at the British Women's Open and topped the money list on the Ladies European Tour. She was a member of the 2002 European Solheim Cup Team and was awarded the Spanish Royal Order of Merit for Sports in the bronze category.

At the end of 2002, she tied for 31st at the LPGA Final Qualifying Tournament to earn non-exempt status for the 2003 LPGA season. During 2003–2005 her best LPGA Tour finish was a tie for sixth at the Franklin American Mortgage Championship. She teamed with Ana Belen Sánchez to represent Spain at the inaugural Women's World Cup of Golf in 2005 and teamed with Marta Prieto in the 2006 Women's World Cup of Golf. She did not play on the LPGA in 2006 due to the birth to her first child, son Izan Corretja.

Marti returned to the LET in 2007. She finished tied 3rd at the MFS Women's Australian Open Championship, her first event of the season. She posted seven top ten finishes in seventeen 2007 starts however was not selected for the 2007 Solheim Cup team.

Marti finished second at the 2007 Deutsche Bank Ladies Swiss Open, losing to Bettina Hauert at the fourth extra hole of a play-off. In 2008, she posted ten top ten finishes, including three runner-up spots, ending the year ranked 8th on the tour's money list.

She had a second son with partner Ivan Corretja, a boy named Jan, on 22 November 2010.

Professional wins (3)

Ladies European Tour wins
2001 (2) Ladies Italian Open, Kellogg's All-Bran Ladies British Masters

ALPG Tour wins
2002 (1) EDUCOM ALPG Players' Championship

Team appearances
Amateur
European Girls' Team Championship (representing Spain): 1997 (winners)
Junior Ryder Cup (representing Europe): 1997

Professional
Solheim Cup (representing Europe): 2002
World Cup (representing Spain): 2005, 2006, 2008

See also 

List of Florida Gators women's golfers on the LPGA Tour

References

External links 

Spanish female golfers
Golfers from Catalonia
Florida Gators women's golfers
Ladies European Tour golfers
LPGA Tour golfers
Solheim Cup competitors for Europe
Sportspeople from Barcelona
1980 births
Living people
20th-century Spanish women
21st-century Spanish women